Thiessen may refer to:

 Alfred H. Thiessen (1872–1956), American meteorologist
 Brad Thiessen (ice hockey player, born 1986), Canadian ice hockey player
 Bradley Thiessen, American statistician and academic administrator 
 Dan Thiessen (1946–2014), college football coach
 Dan Thiessen (politician) (1922-2012), Kansas state legislator
 Del Thiessen, American psychology professor
 Duane D. Thiessen (born 1951), Lieutenant General in US Marine Corps
 Georg Heinrich Thiessen (1914–1961), German astronomer
 Gordon Thiessen (born 1938), Governor of the Bank of Canada from 1994–2001

 J. Grant Thiessen (born 1947), Canadian bibliographer and bookseller
 Jack Thiessen (1931-2022), lexicographer
 James Thiessen (born 1974), former Australian rules footballer
 Jayson Thiessen (born 1976), Canadian director
 Juliana Thiessen Day (born 1980), former 1998 Miss Canadian Universe
 Marc Thiessen (born 1967), American author and speech-writer for President George W. Bush
 Matt Thiessen (born 1980), Canadian-American musician
 Nolan Thiessen (born 1980), Canadian curler
 Peter Adolf Thiessen (1899–1990), German physical chemist
 Tiffani Thiessen (born 1974), American actress
 Vern Thiessen (born 1964), Canadian playwright

Places 
 Thiessen (crater), a lunar impact crater that lies in the far northern latitudes, on the far side of the Moon. To the west of Thiessen is the younger crater Ricco, and to the south-southwest is Roberts. Farther to the east lies Heymans
 Thießen, a village in Saxony-Anhalt, Germany

See also
 Theissen (disambiguation)
 Thiess (disambiguation)
 Theiss (disambiguation)
 Thissen (disambiguation)
 Thyssen (disambiguation)

Danish-language surnames
German-language surnames
North German surnames
Surnames from given names
Russian Mennonite surnames